Hojer, Højer or Höjer is the surname of the following people 

Antonín Hojer (1894–1964), Czechoslovak football player
Axel Höjer (1890–1974), Swedish physician
František Hojer (1896–1940), Czechoslovak football player, brother of Antonín
Gerda Höjer (1893–1974), Swedish nurse and politician 
Gunnar Höjer (1875–1936), Swedish gymnast 
Jesper Højer (born 1978/79), Danish businessman, CEO of Lidl
Ladislav Hojer (1958–1986), Czechoslovak serial killer
Lars Højer (born 1970), Danish football midfielder
Steffen Højer (born 1973), Danish football player